Historically, the adjective Brabançon refers to a native of the Duchy of Brabant.  It can also refer to:

 Brabançons, a group of mercenaries active in Europe between 1166 and 1214
 Brabançon horse, see Belgian Draught
 Petit Brabançon, a type of toy dog
 La Brabançonne, the national anthem of Belgium